American Sikhs number nearly 500,000 people and account for 0.2% of the United States population as of 2021, forming the country's sixth-largest religious group. The largest Sikh populations in the U.S. are found in California, especially in the Central Valley, followed by New York and Washington.
Sikhism is a religion originating from medieval India (predominantly from the Punjab region of modern-day India and Pakistan) which was introduced into the United States during the 19th century. While most American Sikhs are Punjabi, the United States also has a number of non-Punjabi converts to Sikhism.

Sikh men are typically identifiable by their unshorn beards and turbans (head coverings), articles of their faith. Following the 9/11 terrorist attacks, and subsequent other terrorism related activities by Islamic groups, Sikhs have often been mistaken as Muslims or Arabs, and have been subject to several hate crimes, including murders. Sikh temples have also been targets of violence due to being mistaken for mosques. A 2012 shooting at a Sikh temple in Oak Creek, Wisconsin garnered national and international attention, with then President Obama ordering flags to be half-staffed at all federal buildings.

History

First immigrants

Sikhs have lived in the United States for more than 130 years. The first Sikh immigrants to the United States started to arrive in the second half of the 19th century, when poor economic conditions in British India drove many Indians to emigrate elsewhere. Most Sikh immigrants to the United States came from the province of Punjab and came to the U.S. to work on agricultural farms in California, travelling via Hong Kong to Angel Island.

In the years just after 1900, hundreds of Sikhs had arrived to work in the lumber mills of Bellingham, Washington. In 1907, 400–500 white men, predominantly members of the Asiatic Exclusion League, attacked the Sikhs’ homes in what is now known as the Bellingham riots. This quickly drove the East Indian immigrants out of the town.

Some Sikhs worked in lumber mills of Oregon or in railroad construction and for some Sikhs it was on a railway line, which allowed other Sikhs who were working as migrant laborers to come into the town on festival days.

A big effect on Sikh migration to the western states occurred during World War I and World War II, where Sikhs were recruited by the British Indian Army to serve for them. Sikhs fought bravely during these wars and began to live in England after their serving period. Among the Sikhs who already lived in America prior to the wars, many Sikhs joined them, mainly during World Wars I and II. Among those who served in the US military include Bhagat Singh Thind in World War I.

The first Sikh gurdwara established in the U.S. was the Gurdwara Sahib Stockton, in Stockton, California, which was established in 1912 by Baba Wasakha Singh Ji Dadehar and Baba Jawala Singh Ji.

Discrimination after the September 11 attacks

As a result of the September 11 attacks, some Sikh Americans have become subject to discrimination, often from individuals who mistakenly believe that they are Arab or Muslim.

Balbir Singh Sodhi, a gas station owner, was killed on September 15, 2001, due to being mistaken for a Muslim. In a 2011 report to the United States Senate, the Southern Poverty Law Center reported several assaults and incidents of arson at Sikh temples after September 11. All were labeled as hate crimes that resulted from the perpetrators' misconceptions that their targets were Muslim. In August 2012, a Sikh temple in Oak Creek, Wisconsin, was the site of a shooting, leading to six Sikh individuals being killed. On May 7, 2013, an elderly Sikh man was attacked with an iron bar in Fresno, California, in a possible hate crime. On September 21, 2013, Prabhjot Singh, a Sikh professor was attacked in Harlem, New York, by a group of 20-30 men who branded him as "Osama" and Terrorist".

A 2007 survey of Sikh students by the Sikh Coalition found that three out of four male students interviewed "had been teased or harassed on account of their religious identity." In 2014, the Sikh Coalition released a national report on the bullying of Sikh children in American schools. The report found that 55.8% of Sikh students surveyed in Indianapolis reported being bullied, while 54.5% of Sikh students surveyed in Fresno, California, reported being bullied. According to the surveys, Sikh students wearing turbans are twice as likely to be bullied as the average American child.

Converts

In the 1960s, due to increased Indian immigration and rising interest in Indian spirituality in the American counterculture, a number of non-Punjabi Americans began to enter 3HO. Prominent in this trend was Yogi Bhajan, leader of the Sikh-related movement 3HO (Healthy, Happy, Holy Organization), whose Los Angeles temple was the first to introduce non-Punjabi Americans to Sikhism.

Demography

Occupations

Bhagat Singh Thind v. United States

Sikhs have served in the United States military at least as far back as the early 20th century, when one Bhagat Singh Thind, who though not a citizen joined the United States Army and served in World War I. Thind requested citizenship at the end of the war, being granted and revoked twice, before finally being naturalized in 1936.  Far larger numbers of Sikhs served in World War II, and all American wars following.

The ability of observant Sikhs to serve in the American military has, since 1985, been compromised by a discontinuation of exemptions to uniform standards which previously allowed Sikhs to maintain their religiously mandated beards and turbans while in uniform. As of 2010, a Sikh doctor, Kamaljeet S. Kalsi, and dentist, Tejdeep Singh Rattan, are the only Sikh officers to be permitted to serve in uniform with beard and turban. In addition, Simranpreet Lamba was permitted to enlist, with exemption to wear his turban and beard, in 2010 due to his knowledge of Punjabi and Hindi.

Military 
In the federal appeals court in Washington, a preliminary injunction allowed two Sikh men to enter the military recruit training wearing a turban as it was considered an article of religion. The military recruits Milaap Singh Chahal and Jaskirat Singh sued the Marine Corps in April due to violation of the first amendment which allows the freedom of religion. The branch that they were a part of declined full religious exemption.

Policing
In 2016, the New York City Police Department (NYPD) began to allow turbans, subject to standards compatible with unimpeded performance of duty. In 2015, Sandeep Dhaliwal became the first Deputy Sheriff in Texas to wear a turban on duty (Harris County Sherriff's Office). He was shot and killed from behind in 2019 while conducting a routine traffic stop on the Copperbrook subdivision in Houston Texas.

In 2019, the Houston Police Department changed their rules to allow beards and turbans, joining 25 other law enforcement agencies.

Professionals
Many Sikhs started life in America working in lumber mills, mines, and as farm laborers, with many eventually becoming landowners. Many early Sikh immigrants were restaurant owners. In 1956, Dalip Singh Saund became the first Asian Indian-born person to be elected to the United States House of Representatives.

Elected officials
 Dalip Singh Saund served three terms in the United States House of Representatives between 1957 and 1963. He was the first Asian American and the first person of a non-Abrahamic faith to serve in Congress.
 Preet Didbal was elected to the position of mayor of Yuba City, California in 2017. She is the first Sikh woman to serve as a city mayor in United States history.
 Balvir Singh was elected to the Burlington County Board of Chosen Freeholders, New Jersey on November 7, 2017. He became the first Asian-American to win a countywide election in Burlington County and the first Sikh-American to win a countywide election in New Jersey.
 City planner Satyendra Huja was elected mayor of Charlottesville, Virginia in January 2012.
 Amarjit Singh Buttar was elected in December 2001 to the Vernon, Connecticut Board of Education and won re-election in 2011.
 United States Ambassador to the United Nations and former Governor of South Carolina Nikki Haley was born a Sikh but later converted to Christianity.
 Ravinder Bhalla was elected mayor of Hoboken, New Jersey in November 2017. He is also the first Sikh mayor to wear a turban.
 Satwinder Kaur became the first Sikh elected to the City Council of Kent, Washington in November 2017.
 Manka Dhingra of Washington became the first Sikh woman elected to a state legislature in November 2017.
 Pargat S. Sandhu was elected as mayor of Galt, California on Dec 3, 2019. He became the first Sikh to be elected for City Council and Mayor for the city of Galt.
 In November 2020, California's Sutter County and Stanislaus County became the first two America to elect turbaned Sikh supervisors (Karm Bains and Mani Grewal, respectively).

Geographical distribution

States 
Approximately half of all American Sikhs live in California.

Counties

Metropolitan areas

Communities 

Areas with prominent Sikh populations include the Richmond Hill neighborhood of the New York borough of Queens, as well as Yuba City, California, southwest Bakersfield, California, Stockton, California, Carteret, New Jersey, Livingston, California, and Millbourne, Pennsylvania.

Richmond Hill is often referred to as "Little Punjab" due to its large Sikh population. In 2020, the stretch of 101st Avenue between 111th and 123rd streets was renamed Punjab Avenue (ਪੰਜਾਬ ਐਵੇਨਿਊ) and the stretch of 97th Avenue between Lefferts Boulevard and 117th Street was renamed Gurdwara Street. The stretch of Grant Street in Stockton between Dr. Martin Luther King Jr. Boulevard and Sixth Street was renamed Sikh Temple Street in 2012 in honor of the centennial of the founding of the Gurdwara Sahib of Stockton, the oldest in the United States.

{|class="sortable wikitable"
|+ Number of Sikh Americans in selected communities, 2021
! Community !! Population (2021) !! Percentage (2021)  !! Population (2000) !! Percentage (2000) 
|-
|New York, New York||26,973|||| 25,376||
|-
|Richmond Hill, Queens, New York, New York||9,953||
|-
|Fresno, California||18,603||||4,012||
|-
|Yuba City, California||10,207||||6,496||
|-
|San Jose, California||9,840||||8,357||
|-
|Bakersfield, California||8,131||||2,907||
|-
|Sacramento, California||7,165||||2,327||
|-
|Los Angeles, California||6,103||||4,523||
|-
|Stockton, California||4,951||||2,002||
|-
|San Francisco, California||3,958||||749||
|-
|Carteret, New Jersey||2,806||||851||
|-
|Livingston, California||2,798||||1,793||
|-
|Live Oak, California||1,284||||933||
|-
|Fowler, California||499||||58||
|-
|Millbourne, Pennsylvania||71||||67||
|-

|}

In addition to these areas, there is a concentration of non-Punjabi converts to Sikhism in Española, New Mexico.

Notable Sikh Americans
 Taegh Sokhey, created the world's first virtual reality Alzheimer's/Dementia tool, entrepreneur, medical researcher
 Ravinder Bhalla, Mayor of Hoboken, New Jersey
 Preet Bharara,  U.S. Attorney for the Southern District of New York, 2009–2017
 Gurbaksh Chahal, entrepreneur
 Sant Singh Chatwal, businessperson
 Vikram Chatwal, hotelier and actor
 Harmeet Dhillon, vice chairman of the California Republican Party
 Gurbir Grewal, Attorney General of New Jersey, and former prosecutor of Bergen County, New Jersey
 Ryan Hurst, actor, converted to Sikhism and uses the Sikh name Gobind Seva Singh
 Narinder Singh Kapany, physicist
 Snatam Kaur, singer, songwriter, and author
 Harpreet Sandhu, member of the Richmond City Council (California), 2007–2008
 Dalip Singh Saund, member of United States House of Representatives from California's 29th district, 1957–1963; first Asian Pacific American member of Congress
 Arjun Singh Sethi, civil rights writer, political rights writer, human rights lawyer, and professor of law
 Balvir Singh, Freeholder, Burlington County, New Jersey
 G. B. Singh, author
 Bhagat Singh Thind, first turbaned soldier in United States Army; plaintiff in United States v. Bhagat Singh Thind, involving an important legal battle over the rights of Indians to obtain U.S. citizenship
 Harbhajan Singh Yogi,  yogi, spiritual teacher, and entrepreneur
 Waris Ahluwalia, actor and tastemaker
 Simran Jeet Singh, author and civil rights activist
 Preet Didbal, mayor of Yuba City, California; first Sikh woman mayor
 Manka Dhingra, state senator of Washington; first Sikh state senator
 Sandeep Dhaliwal, First member of the Sikh community in Harris County, Texas, to be allowed to wear his turban and beard while on duty as a Harris County Sheriff's deputy. Murdered by a motorist during a traffic stop in 2019.

See also
 Indian American
 Indians in the New York City metropolitan region
 Sikhism by country
 List of gurdwaras in the United States
 Murder of Balbir Singh Sodhi
 Wisconsin Sikh temple shooting
 Sikhism in Australia
 Sikhism in Canada
 Sikhism in the United Kingdom
 Sikhism in New Zealand

Notes

References

Further reading

 Atkinson, David C. The burden of white supremacy: Containing Asian migration in the British empire and the United States (U North Carolina Press, 2016).
 Hawley, John Stratton, and Gurinder Singh Mann. Studying the Sikhs: Issues for North America (State University of New York Press, 1993).
 Kurien, Prema. "Shifting US racial and ethnic identities and Sikh American activism." RSF: The Russell Sage Foundation Journal of the Social Sciences 4.5 (2018): 81–98. online
 Mahmood, Cynthia Keppley, and Stacy Brady. The Guru's Gift: An Ethnography Exploring Gender Equality with North American Sikh Women (Mayfield Publishers, 2000).
 Mann, Gurinder Singh et al. Buddhists, Hindus, and Sikhs in America (Oxford University Press, 2008).
 Sidhu, Dawinder S., and Neha Singh Gohil. Civil Rights in Wartime: The Post-9/11 Sikh Experience (Ashgate, 2009).
 Stabin, Tova. "Sikh Americans." in Gale Encyclopedia of Multicultural America,'' edited by Thomas Riggs, (3rd ed., vol. 4, Gale, 2014), pp. 179–192. Online

External links
 Pioneering Punjabis Digital archive at the University of California, Davis
 Sikh Research Institute
 Center for Sikh and Punjab Studies at the University of California, Santa Barbara